DeMoss is a surname. Notable people with the surname include:

Bingo DeMoss (1889–1965), American baseball player
Bob DeMoss (1927–2017), American football player
Darcy DeMoss (born 1963), American actress
Grace DeMoss (born 1927), American golfer
Harold R. DeMoss Jr. (born 1930), American judge
Hugh DeMoss (1932–2003), American journalist and politician
Mary Hissem De Moss (1871–1960), American soprano singer
Mickie DeMoss (born 1955), American basketball player and coach
Nancy DeMoss Wolgemuth (born 1958), American Christian radio host and author